Serinolamide A is a naturally occurring eicosanoid derivative related to anandamide, which has been isolated from the marine cyanobacteria Lyngbya majuscula and related species in the Oscillatoria family. 

Testing established that serinolamide A is an active cannabinoid agonist with moderate potency, having a Ki of 1300 nM at CB1 and five fold selectivity over the related CB2 receptor.

See also 
 Methanandamide
 O-1812
 Perrottetinene

References

External links
What Is CBG Oil?
CBD Oil For Pain

Cannabinoids
Fatty acid amides